The following is a list of mayors of the municipality of Carolina, Puerto Rico.

List of mayors

19th century
 Jose Ramirez, circa 1826
 Lorenzo de Vizcarrondo, Ortiz de Zárate, circa 1857
 Nicasio Viña, circa 1859
 José R. Medina, circa 1860
 Juan Cordero, circa 1861
 Pablo Mediavilla, circa 1862-1863
 Isidro García, circa 1864-1865
 Manuel Paniagua, circa 1866-1867
 Juan M. de Sárraga, circa 1867-1869
 Emiliano Díaz, circa 1869
 José Manuel Aguayo, circa 1871
 Juan José Machicote, circa 1871-1872
 Nicanor Zeno, circa 1872
 Francisco Acosta, circa 1872-1873
 Francisco de Paula Pérez, circa 1873
 Juan José Machicote, circa 1874
 Eugenio Malpica, circa 1876
 Lorenzo J. de Vizcarrondo, José Suárez, Ramón H. Delgado, circa 1877
 Francisco Acosta, circa 1879
 Ramiro Matute, circa 1881
 José Mercado, circa 1883-1884
 José Roig Colomer, Manuel Gil Sánchez, circa 1884
 Delfín Sierra, circa 1885
 Isidoro Uriarte, circa 1885-1887
 Antonio Acha, circa 1887-1890
 Joaquín de Fonseca, Francisco Molina Nebot, circa 1890
 Francisco Gómez, circa 1893
 Francisco Molina, circa 1895
 Francisco Jiménez Sicardó, circa 1896-1898
 Justo Casablanca, circa 1898
 Ramón H. Delgado, circa 1898-1899
 Eugenio Malpica, circa 1899-1900

20th-21st centuries
 Ramón H. Delgado, circa 1900-1905
 Narciso Font Guillot, circa 1905-1918
 Epifanio Vizcarrondo, circa 1918
 Gregorio Hernández, circa 1919-1921
 Juan Osorio, circa 1921
 Aurelio Millán, circa 1925
 Félix Rivera, circa 1929
 Jesús M. Fragoso, circa 1933
 Domingo Cáceres, circa 1937
 Juan Osorio, circa 1941
 José Allende, circa 1943
 Federico Cordero, circa 1945
 Jesús Suárez, circa 1956
 Antonio Jiménez Landrau, circa 1961
 Heriberto Nieves, 1968-1972
 Manuel Fernández Corujo, circa 1973
 Roberto Iglesias Pérez, 1976-1984
 José Aponte de la Torre, 1984-2007
 José Aponte Dalmau, 2007-present

References

Carolina